Shirshendu Mukhopadhyay (born 2 November 1935) is a Bengali author from India. He has written stories for both adults and children. He is known for creating the relatively new fictional sleuths Barodacharan, Fatik, and Shabor Dasgupta.

Life 
Shirshendu Mukhopadhyay was born in Mymensingh (now in Bangladesh) on 2 November 1935. The Mukhopadhyays were originally from Bainkhara, Bikrampur. During partition his family migrated to Kolkata. He spent his childhood in Bihar and many places in Bengal and Assam accompanying his father, who worked in the railways. He passed intermediate from the Victoria College, Koch Bihar before taking a Masters in Bengali from Calcutta University.

Mukhopadhyay started his career as a school teacher and is now on the staff of Anandabazar Patrika at Kolkata. He is associated with the Bengali magazine Desh.

Comics from his stories 
A comic based on his book Bipinbabur Bipad was released. With artwork by Swapn Debnath, the 48-page comic was published in monthly issues of Anandamela (September 2006 to December 2006). Another story Nababganjer Agantuk, is now in the process of becoming an action comics by Visual Literature Entertainment, a group of new generation comics creators. Four more comics based on his novellas have been brought out by Parul Prakashani: Patalghar, Bidhu Daroga, Pagla Saheber Kabor and Patashgarer Jangale. They are created by Sujog Bandyopadhyaya. His popular children's novel, Gosainbaganer Bhoot, was done into a graphic novel, The Ghost of Gosainbagan. Mukhopadhyaya wrote series of comic detective story of Goenda Baradacharan.

Film adaptions 
Mukhopadhyay's novels were later adopted in movies.
 Hirer Angti was adapted into a movie Hirer Angti by Rituporno Ghosh in 1992.
 Nabiganjer Daitto was adapted into a movie Ajab Gayer Ajab Katha by Tapan Sinha in 1998.
 PatalGhor was adapted into a movie Patalghar by Abhijit Choudhury in 2003.
 His short story "Dosar" was filmed by Rituparno Ghosh in B/W format into the film Dosar in 2006.
 Sadhubabar Lathi was adapted into a movie Sadhu Babar Lathi in 2008.
 In 2010, a film has been released named Banshiwala, the script of which is adopted from the novel 'Banshiwala', written by him. 'Banshiwala' was also published in Desh Patrika.
 Kagojer Bou was also adapted into a 2011 film by director Bappaditya Bandopadhyay.
 Gosainbaganer Bhoot, published in "Pujabarshiki Anandamela" adapted into a movie, Gosainbaganer Bhoot in 2011.
 Chayamoy, published in "Pujabarshiki Anandamela" has been adapted into a movie by director Haranath Chakraborty and is scheduled to release in 2013. It stars Sabyasachi Chakrabarty (in the title role), Dipankar De and Gaurav Chakrabarty.
 Goynar Baksho has been adapted into a movie by director Aparna Sen in 2013.
 Ashchorjyo Prodeep has been adapted into a movie by director Anik Dutta in 2013.
 Wrin has been adapted into a movie named Ebar Shabor by director Arindam Sil in 2015.
 Eagoler Chokh has been adapted into a movie by director Arindam Sil in 2016.
 Aschhe Abar Shabor is a 2018 film and third installment of Goenda Shabor film series, is based on his story Prajapatir Mrityu O Punarjanmo.
 Manojder Adbhut Bari is a 2018 film of Anindya Chatterjee is based on the novel in the same name.
 Bony is a 2021 film based on the novel of the same name.
 Tirandaj Shabor is a 2022 film and fourth installment of Goenda Shabor film series, based on his novel Tirandaj.

Works 
"Jal Taranga" was his first story published in the magazine "Desh" in 1959. After 7/8 years of writing story "Ghunpoka" was his first novel published in the annual Puja edition of the magazine Desh. His first children's novel was called Manojder Adbhut Bari.

Adult fiction

Young adult fiction 

 Nilu Hajrar Hatyaarahasya
 Pidimer Aalo
 Phajal Ali Esechhe
 Phulchor
 Bikeler Mrityu - Tells the story of Bobby Roy, an executive and Leena, his P.S.
 Jao Pakhi
 Laal Nil Manush
 Shyaola
 Shiulir Gandha
 Shada Beral, Kalo Beral
 Dhonnobad Mastarmoshai
 Baghumannar Borat

Children's fiction (Odvuture Series)

Awards 
 Vidyasagar Award (1985) – for his contributions to children's literature.
 Ananda Purashkar (1973 and 1990).
 Sahitya Akademi award (1989) for his novel Manabjamin.
 Banga Bibhushan award (2012).
 Sahitya Akademi Fellowship (2021).
 ABP Ananda Sera Bangali Award (Sera'r sera)

References

External links  
 
 

Bengali writers
Bengali-language writers
Novelists from West Bengal
Bengali detective fiction writers
1935 births
Living people
Indian children's writers
University of Calcutta alumni
Recipients of the Ananda Purashkar
Recipients of the Sahitya Akademi Award in Bengali
People from Mymensingh District
20th-century Indian novelists
21st-century Indian novelists
Writers from Kolkata